Kae Tempest (formerly Kate Tempest) is an English spoken word performer, poet, recording artist, novelist and playwright.

At the age of 16, Tempest was accepted into the BRIT School for Performing Arts and Technology in Croydon. In 2013, they won the Ted Hughes Award for their work Brand New Ancients. They were named a Next Generation Poet by the Poetry Book Society, a once-a-decade accolade. Tempest's albums Everybody Down and Let Them Eat Chaos have been nominated for the Mercury Music Prize. The latter's accompanying poetry book (also titled Let Them Eat Chaos) was nominated for the Costa Book of the Year in the Poetry Category. Their debut novel The Bricks That Built the Houses was a Sunday Times best-seller and won the 2017 Books Are My Bag Readers Award for Breakthrough Author. They were nominated as Best Female Solo Performer at the 2018 Brit Awards. Tempest came out as non-binary in 2020, using pronouns they/them.

Personal life

Tempest grew up in Brockley, South East London, one of five children whose father was a corporate media lawyer, and their mother a teacher. Tempest worked in a record shop from age 14 to 18. They went to Thomas Tallis School, leaving at 16 to study at the BRIT School for Performing Arts and Technology in Croydon, going on to graduate in English Literature from Goldsmiths, University of London. Tempest first performed at 16, at open mic nights at Deal Real, a small hip-hop store in Carnaby Street in London's West End. They went on to support acts such as John Cooper Clarke, Billy Bragg and Benjamin Zephaniah. Tempest toured internationally with their band Sound of Rum until the band disbanded in 2012 before being commissioned to write their first play, Wasted.

In August 2020, Tempest came out as non-binary, began using they/them pronouns, and changed their name to Kae.

Career
In 2013, Tempest released their first poetry book Everything Speaks in its Own Way, a limited edition run on their own imprint, Zingaro. At 26, they launched the theatrical spoken word piece Brand New Ancients at the Battersea Arts Centre (2012), to great critical acclaim. The piece also won Tempest the Herald Angel and The Ted Hughes Prize. Some of Tempest's influences include Christopher Logue (their "favourite poet"), Samuel Beckett, James Joyce, W B Yeats, William Blake, W H Auden and Wu-Tang Clan.

In September 2013, their play Hopelessly Devoted was produced by Paines Plough and premiered at Birmingham Rep Theatre.

In 2014, they released the album Everybody Down (Big Dada, Ninja Tune), which was produced by Dan Carey and was nominated for the 2014 Mercury Prize.

Since the release of Everybody Down, Tempest has increased touring as a musician, playing at festivals and headlining shows with their live band which consists of Kwake Bass on drums, Dan Carey on synths and Clare Uchima on keyboards.

In October 2014, their first poetry collection for Picador, Hold Your Own, was published. The collection was a commercial and critical success and its release coincided with Tempest being named a Next Generation Poet.

Tempest was elected a Fellow of the Royal Society of Literature in 2015.

In April 2016, their debut novel The Bricks That Built The Houses was published by Bloomsbury and was a Sunday Times Bestseller. It won the Books Are My Bag Best Breakthrough Author Award.

In September 2016, it was announced that Tempest would curate the 2017 Brighton Festival. They released the album Let Them Eat Chaos on 7 October 2016. It debuted at no. 28 on the UK Albums Chart, and was also released in book format (Picador). The album was also nominated for the Mercury Prize, this time in 2017. They were nominated for Best British Female Solo Performer at the 2018 Brit Awards.

Tempest's song "People's Faces" was used for the Facebook commercial "We're Never Lost If We Can Find Each Other", created by the agency Droga5, and released on 9 April 2020.

Paradise, Tempest's modern adaptation of Sophocles' Greek Classic, Philoctetes, premiered at the National Theatre from 4 August - 11 September 2021. The all-female cast, featuring Lesley Sharp, was directed by Ian Rickson and performed in the Olivier Theatre.

Politics
In November 2019, along with other public figures, Tempest signed a letter supporting Labour Party leader Jeremy Corbyn describing him as "a beacon of hope in the struggle against emergent far-right nationalism, xenophobia and racism in much of the democratic world" and endorsed him in the 2019 UK general election. In December 2019, along with 42 other leading cultural figures, they signed a letter endorsing the Labour Party under Corbyn's leadership in the 2019 general election. The letter stated that "Labour's election manifesto under Jeremy Corbyn's leadership offers a transformative plan that prioritises the needs of people and the planet over private profit and the vested interests of a few."

Reception
The Economist said of Tempest's commission from the Royal Shakespeare Company: "A stunning piece by [Kae] Tempest, a London-born performance poet, comes bursting off the screen. Rarely has the relevance of Shakespeare to our language, to the very fabric of our feelings, been expressed with quite such youthful passion. (It should be mandatory viewing for all teenagers.)" The Huffington Post describes them as "Britain's leading young poet, playwright and rapper...one of the most widely respected performers in the country – the complete package of lyrics and delivery. [They are] also one of the most exciting young writers working in Britain today" (2012). The Guardian commented of Brand New Ancients, "Suddenly it feels as if we are not in a theatre but a church... gathered around a hearth, hearing the age-old stories that help us make sense of our lives. We're given the sense that what we are watching is something sacred." In 2013, the newspaper noted:

[They are] one of the brightest talents around. [Their] spoken-word performances have the metre and craft of traditional poetry, the kinetic agitation of hip-hop and the intimacy of a whispered heart-to-heart... Tempest deals bravely with poverty, class and consumerism. [They do] so in a way that not only avoids the pitfalls of sounding trite, but manages to be beautiful too, drawing on ancient mythology and sermonic cadence to tell stories of the everyday.

In 2013, aged 28, they won the Ted Hughes Award for their work Brand New Ancients, the first person under the age of 40 to win the award, and was selected as one of the 2014 Next Generation Poets by the Poetry Society.

Tempest has received wide critical acclaim for their written and live work. A performance of Brand New Ancients prompted the New York Times to say "As gorgeous streams of words flow out, [they conjure] a story so vivid it’s as if you had a state-of-the-art Blu-ray player stuffed into your brain, projecting image after image that sears itself into your consciousness" while a review by Michiko Kakutani of their poetry collections in the same paper explored their written style: “While [their] intense performances on stage add a fierce urgency to the words, these text versions of [their] work stand powerfully on their own on the page...using [their] pictorial imagination to sear specific images into the reader's mind".

They have been published in nine languages.

Everybody Down was nominated for the 2015 Mercury Music Prize and Let Them Eat Chaos have been nominated for the 2017 Mercury Music Prize. Their accompanying poetry book Let Them Eat Chaos was nominated for the Costa Book of the Year in the Poetry Category in 2016. They were nominated as Best Female Solo Performer at the 2018 Brit Awards.

Publications

Poetry collections
 2012: Everything Speaks in its Own Way
 2013: Brand New Ancients
 2014: Hold Your Own
 2016: Let Them Eat Chaos
 2016: Pictures on a Screen
 2018: Running Upon The Wires

Spoken word performance
 2012: Brand New Ancients – Ted Hughes Award 2013 (2014 released as CD)

Plays
 2013: Wasted
 2014: Glasshouse
 2014: Hopelessly Devoted
 2021: Paradise

Novel
 2016: The Bricks That Built the Houses, Bloomsbury Circus, London

Non-fiction book
 2020: On Connection, Faber & Faber, London

Discography

Studio albums
 2011: Balance (with "Sound of Rum")
 2014: Everybody Down – nominated for Mercury Prize 2014
 2016: Let Them Eat Chaos – nominated for Mercury Prize 2017
 2019: The Book of Traps and Lessons
 2022: The Line Is a Curve

Singles
 2014: "Our Town"
 2014: "Hot Night Cold Spaceship"
 2015: "Bad Place for a Good Time"
 2016: "Guts (with Loyle Carner)"
 2016: "Truth Is Telling (with Blasco Says)"

As featured artist
 2008: "I Got Love (remix)" (The King Blues featuring Kae Tempest) 
 2010: "Drum Song (brentonLABS Remix)" (The Temper Trap featuring Kae Tempest)
 2012: "Forever Ever" (Bastille featuring Kae Tempest & Jay Brown)
 2014: "Our Town" (letthemusicplay featuring Kae Tempest)
 2014: "Rain" (Rag'n'Bone Man featuring Kae Tempest)
 2014: "Summer" (letthemusicplay featuring Kae Tempest)
 2018: "Kairos" (Warsnare featuring Kae Tempest)
 2018: "A Child Is an Open Book" (Damien Dempsey featuring Kae Tempest)
 2018: "Usubscribe" (Jam Baxter featuring Kae Tempest)
 2018: "6 Millions Stories" (Foreign Beggars featuring Kae Tempest, Bangzy, Scott Garcia & Bionic)
 2019: "Blood of the Past" (The Comet is Coming featuring Kae Tempest)
 2020: "Time Is Hardcore" (High Contrast featuring Kae Tempest & Anita Blay)
 2023: "We Were We Still Are" (Fraser T. Smith featuring Kae Tempest)

References

External links
  – official site
 
 Kate Tempest interview with Huey Morgan, BBC, 29 January 2012 (video, 7 mins)
 Kate Tempest "Shelf Life" interview, The Spectator, 12 September 2012
 Kate Tempest on "Writing your own protest song", The Guardian Teacher Network

Living people
21st-century English novelists
21st-century English poets
Rappers from London
Slam poets
Ninja Tune artists
People from Brockley
1985 births
Writers from London
People from Lewisham
Fiction Records artists
Alumni of Goldsmiths, University of London
People educated at Thomas Tallis School
Fellows of the Royal Society of Literature
English spoken word artists
English LGBT poets
LGBT hip hop musicians
Big Dada artists
Lex Records artists
Caroline Records artists
Non-binary writers
Non-binary musicians